Jammin' in New York is George Carlin's 14th album and eighth HBO special, recorded on April 24 and 25, 1992, at the Paramount Theater, on the grounds of Madison Square Garden in New York City. Topics include the war in the Persian Gulf, similarities and differences among average Americans and language used at airports.

The album won a Grammy Award in 1993 for Best Spoken Comedy Album.

On-air HBO promos for the live broadcast on April 25, 1992, referred to the program as George Carlin: Live at the Paramount. Before the opening credits, the words "This show is for SAM" appear. This is a reference to comedian Sam Kinison, who had died in a car crash two weeks before the recording.

Carlin considered Jammin' in New York his favorite and best HBO special.

Track listing
"Rockets and Penises in the Persian Gulf" - 7:35
"Little Things We Share" - 7:47
"Airline Announcements" - 16:44
"Golf Courses for the Homeless" - 11:13
"The Planet Is Fine" - 13:37

References

1990s American television specials
1990s in comedy
HBO network specials
Stand-up comedy concert films
George Carlin live albums
Stand-up comedy albums
Spoken word albums by American artists
Live spoken word albums
1992 live albums
Grammy Award for Best Comedy Album
Albums recorded at Madison Square Garden
1992 television specials
1990s comedy albums